Chi Persei (Chi Per, χ Persei, χ Per) is the name of a star and an open cluster:

 χ Persei, the star 7 Persei
 χ Persei, one half of the Double Cluster

Persei, Chi
Perseus (constellation)